KAAQ (105.9 FM) is a radio station broadcasting a country music format. Licensed to Alliance, Nebraska, United States, the station is currently owned by Eagle Communications, Inc. and features programming from ABC Radio .

References

External links

AAQ
Country radio stations in the United States
Radio stations established in 1981